Michael Kearney (born 19 September 1995) is an Irish hurler who plays for Waterford Senior Championship club Ballyduff Upper and at inter-county level with the Waterford senior hurling team. He usually lines out as a midfielder.

Playing career

Blackwater Community School

Kearney first came to prominence as a hurler with Blackwater Community School where he played in every grade of hurling. On 23 November 2011, he lined out at midfield when Blackwater CS defeated Dungarvan CBS by 0-11 to 0-08 to win the Dean Ryan Cup. Kearney also lined out for the school in the Harty Cup.

Cork Institute of Technology

Kearney studied at the Cork Institute of Technology and joined the senior hurling team in his second year at the institute. He was a regular player in several Fitzgibbon Cup campaigns.

Ballyduff Upper

Kearney joined the Ballyduff Upper club at a young age and played in all grades at juvenile and underage levels before eventually joining the club's top adult team in the Waterford Senior Championship.

Waterford

Minor and under-21

Kearney first lined out for Waterford as a member of the minor team during the 2012 Munster Championship. He made his first appearance for the team on 2 May when he was introduced as a 48th-minute substitute in a 1-20 to 3-13 defeat of Clare.

Kearney was again eligible for the minor grade in 2013 and joined the starting fifteen as a midfielder. On 14 July, he scored a point from play in a 2-19 apiece draw with Limerick in the Munster final. Kearney retained his position at midfield for the replay on 23 July, however, he ended on the losing side following a 1-20 to 4-08 defeat. On 8 September, he scored 0-04 from left wing-forward when Waterford defeated Galway by 1-21 to 0-16 in the All-Ireland final.

Kearney joined the Waterford under-21 team in advance of the 2014 Munster Championship. He made his first appearance for the team on 16 July 2014 when he lined out at midfield in a 3-18 to 0-16 defeat by Cork.

After a disappointing 2015 Munster Championship, Kearney was selected for the under-21 team for a third successive season in 2016. On 27 July, he won a Munster Championship medal after a 2-19 to 0-15 defeat of Tipperary in the final. On 10 September, Kearney won an All-Ireland medal after scoring 0-02 from left corner-forward in a 5-15 to 0-14 defeat of Galway in the final.

Senior

Kearney was added to the Waterford senior team in advance of the 2015 National League. He made his first appearance on 14 February 2015 when he lined out at left corner-forward in a 0-22 to 2-16 draw with Limerick. On 3 May 2015, Kearney won a National League medal as a non-playing substitute when Waterford defeated Cork by 1-24 to 0-17 in the final. He was later included on the Waterford panel for the Munster Championship. On 12 July 2015, Kearney was an unused substitute when Waterford were beaten for the fourth time in six seasons by Tipperary in the Munster final.

On 1 May 2016, Kearney was an unused substitute when Waterford drew 0-22 apiece with Clare in the National League final. He also remained on the bench for the replay, which Waterford lost by 1-23 to 2-19. On 10 July 2016, Kearney was an unused substitute when Waterford suffered a 5-19 to 0-13 defeat by Tipperary in the Munster final.

On 3 September 2017, Kearney was selected as a substitute when Waterford faced Galway in the All-Ireland final. He remained on the bench and ended the game as a runner-up following Galway's 0-26 to 2-17 victory.

On 3 June 2018, Kearney made his first appearance in the Munster Championship when he lined out at right corner-forward against Tipperary. He was substituted in the 47th minute in the eventual 2-22 apiece draw.

On 31 March 2019, Kearney was named at centre-forward but lined out at right wing-forward when Waterford faced Limerick in the National League final. He was held scoreless in the 1-24 to 0-19 defeat.

Career statistics

Honours

Blackwater Community School
Dean Ryan Cup (1): 2011

Waterford
National Hurling League (1): 2015
All-Ireland Under-21 Hurling Championship (1): 2016
Munster Under-21 Hurling Championship (1): 2016
All-Ireland Minor Hurling Championship (1): 2013

References

1995 births
Living people
CIT hurlers
Ballyduff Upper hurlers
Waterford inter-county hurlers